Igor Konstantinovich Klimov (born 1 November 1989) is a Russian football defender. He plays for FC Tekstilshchik Ivanovo.

Career
Klimov made his professional debut for FC Rubin Kazan on 27 June 2007 in the Russian Cup game against FC Lukhovitsy. He made two more appearances for Rubin in the following two Russian Cup seasons, but never in a league game.

He made his Russian Football National League debut for FC Khimki on 28 March 2010 in a game against FC Salyut Belgorod.

External links
 

1989 births
Living people
People from Primorsky Krai
Russian footballers
Russia youth international footballers
FC Rubin Kazan players
FC Khimki players
FC Sibir Novosibirsk players
FC Orenburg players
FC Yenisey Krasnoyarsk players
FC Sokol Saratov players
FC Volgar Astrakhan players
FC Rotor Volgograd players
FC Mordovia Saransk players
FC Tom Tomsk players
Association football defenders
FC Veles Moscow players
FC Tekstilshchik Ivanovo players
Sportspeople from Primorsky Krai